

Events 
 January–March 
 January 12 – George Hamilton, 1st Earl of Orkney, becomes the first Field Marshal of Great Britain.
 January 23 – The Civil Code of 1734 is passed in Sweden.
 January 26 – Stanislaus I of Poland abdicates his throne.
 February 12 – Francis I, Holy Roman Emperor marries Maria Theresa of Austria, ruler of the Habsburg Empire.
 March 8 – Nader Shah, founder of the Afsharid dynasty, is crowned Shah of Iran on a date selected by court astrologers.
 March 31 – Bellevue Hospital is founded in New York.

 April–June 
 April 14 – The Porteous Riots erupt in Edinburgh (Scotland), after the execution of smuggler Andrew Wilson, when town guard Captain John Porteous orders his men to fire at the crowd. Porteous is arrested later.
 April 14 – German adventurer Theodor Stephan Freiherr von Neuhoff is crowned King Theodore of Corsica, 25 days after his arrival on Corsica on March 20. His reign ends on November 5 when he flees the island.
 April 19 – A fire in Stony Stratford, England, consumes 53 houses.
 April – The Genbun era begins in Japan. The era of Kyōhō Reforms ends.
 May 8 – Frederick, Prince of Wales, marries Princess Augusta of Saxe-Gotha.
 May 22 – King George II of Great Britain departs for Europe as part of his duties as Elector of Hanover; his wife, Caroline, Queen Consort rules on his behalf as the Regent for the last time until his return on January 14, 1736. 
 May 26 – Battle of Ackia: British and Chickasaw Native Americans defeat French troops.
 June 8 – Leonhard Euler writes to James Stirling describing the Euler–Maclaurin formula, providing a connection between integrals and sums.
 June 19 – A French Academy of Sciences expedition, led by Pierre Louis Maupertuis, with Anders Celsius, begins work on measuring a meridian arc in Meänmaa, Finland.
 June 24 – Witchcraft Act of 1735 in Great Britain comes into effect, criminalizing claimants accusing people of practising witchcraft or of possessing magical powers, intended to end legal witch trials in the early modern period in the country.

 July–September 
 July 1 – Russo-Turkish War (1735–39): Russian forces under Peter Lacy storm the Ottoman fortress of Azov. 
 August 12 – A fire in Saint Petersburg, capital of the Russian Empire, destroys 2,000 buildings, the city's post office, and several palaces.
 September 7 – An Edinburgh crowd drags John Porteous out of his cell in Tolbooth Prison, and lynches him.
 September 29 – The Gin Act 1736 goes into effect, placing a steep tax on the sale of gin and license requirements for its sale, with the intent of reducing consumption of the liquor in Britain.  Widely ignored, the Act is repealed in 1743. 

 October–December 
 October 3 – French scientist Charles Marie de La Condamine and a team of surveyors begin the first measurements at the Equator to determine the exact meridian arc measurement of distance between points separated by one degree of longitude in order to make a precise calculation of the Earth's circumference.    The initial measurements, made in what is now Ecuador, last until November 3. 
 November 5 – King Theodore of Corsica flees the island after a reign of seven months and the kingdom reverts to French control. 
 November 13 – Word of the discovery of silver, south of what is now the U.S.-Mexican border, reaches Sonora Governor Juan Bautista Anza and soon leads to prospectors coming to Nogales to find more silver.    Late in October, a Yaqui Indian prospector, Antonio Siraumea, had discovered large slabs of silver ("Las planchas de plata"), and at the Estancia Arizona, a ranch owned by Captain Bernardo de Urrea.  The region, and later the U.S. territory, and state of Arizona are named for Urrea's ranch.
 December 7 – Benjamin Franklin builds the first volunteer fire company in Philadelphia.
 December 26 – Andrew Michael Ramsay gives an oration, in which he relates the heritage and internationalism of Freemasonry to that of the Crusades.

 Date unknown 
 Neustrelitz becomes the capital of Mecklenburg-Strelitz.
 Bushehr is founded in Persia.
 The Belgrade Fortress is completed.
 One of the earliest records of use of a bathing machine is made at Scarborough, England.
 Charles Marie de La Condamine, with François Fresneau Gataudière, makes the first scientific observations of rubber, in Ecuador.
 Leonhard Euler produces the first published proof of Fermat's "little theorem".
 Sir Isaac Newton's Method of Fluxions (1671), describing his method of differential calculus, is first published (posthumously) and Thomas Bayes publishes a defense of its logical foundations (anonymously).
 Muhammad ibn Abd al-Wahhab writes the Kitab at-tawhidt, marking the beginning of Wahhabism.
 The Haidamakas raid the shtetl of Pavoloch, killing 35.

Births 

 January 7 – Andrew Adams, American judge (d. 1797)

 January 19 – James Watt, Scottish inventor (d. 1819)
 January 25 – Joseph-Louis Lagrange, Italian-born mathematician (d. 1813)
 February 3 – Johann Georg Albrechtsberger, Austrian musician (d. 1809)
 February 29 – Ann Lee, English-born American religious leader (d. 1784)
March 20 - Rama I, First King of Siam (d. 1809) 
 May 8 – Caterina Dolfin, Italian (Venetian) poet  (d. 1793)
 May 10 – George Steevens, English literary critic (d. 1800)
 May 29 – Patrick Henry, American patriot (d. 1799)
 June 3 – Sir John Acton, 6th Baronet, Prime Minister of Naples (d. 1811)
 June 7 – Fermín Lasuén, Spanish missionary (d. 1803)

 June 14 – Charles-Augustin de Coulomb, French physicist (d. 1806)
 June 21 – Enoch Poor, American general (d. 1780)
 June 25 – John Horne Tooke, English politician, philologist (d. 1812)
 July –  Juan Bautista de Anza, Governor of the Spanish Province of New Mexico (d. 1788)

 August 9 – Louis Joseph, Prince of Condé (d. 1818)
 August 15 – Alexander Runciman, Scottish painter (d. 1785)
 August 26 – Jean-Baptiste L. Romé de l'Isle, French geologist (d. 1790)
 September 15 – Jean Sylvain Bailly, French astronomer (d. 1793)
 September 16 – Carter Braxton, signer of the American Declaration of Independence (d. 1797)
 October 27 –  James Macpherson, Scottish poet (d. 1796)
 date unknown
 Robert Jephson, Irish dramatist (d.  1803)
 Li Ching-Yuen, Chinese herbalist, martial artist and tactical advisor (d.1933) (claimed)
 Pierre le Pelley I, Seigneur of Sark (d. 1778)
 Claudius Smith, American revolutionary (d. 1779)
 Sir James Tylney-Long, 7th Baronet, English politician (d. 1794)

Deaths 
 January 8 – Jean Leclerc (theologian), Swiss theologian and biblical scholar (b. 1657)
 January 17 – Matthäus Daniel Pöppelmann, German architect (b. 1662)
 January 31  – Filippo Juvarra, Italian architect (b. 1678)
 February 1 – James Stanley, 10th Earl of Derby, English politician (b. 1664)
 February 7 – Stephen Gray, English dyer, astronomer, and scientist (b. 1666)
 March 16 – Giovanni Battista Pergolesi, Italian composer (b. 1710)
 March 25 – Nicholas Hawksmoor, British architect (b. c. 1661)

 April 21 – Prince Eugene of Savoy, French-born Austrian general (b. 1663)
 April 30 – Johann Albert Fabricius, German scholar and bibliographer (b. 1668)
 May 9 – Diogo de Mendonça Corte-Real, Portuguese politician (b. 1658)
 June 6 – Jean Baptiste de La Vérendrye, explorer of New France, eldest son of Pierre Gaultier de Varennes et de La Vérendrye (b. 1713)
 July 1 – Ahmed III, Ottoman Sultan (b. 1673)
 July 7 – William Hardres, British politician (b. 1686)
 August 14 – Victor Honoré Janssens, Flemish painter (b. 1658)

 September 16 – Daniel Gabriel Fahrenheit, German physicist and inventor (b. 1686)
 September 26 – Louise Diane d'Orléans, youngest child of Philippe II, Duke of Orleans (b. 1716)
 October 22 – George Clarke, English politician, architect (b. 1661)
 November 2 – Louis Antoine de Pardaillan de Gondrin, French duke (b. 1664)
 December 10 – António Manoel de Vilhena, Portuguese 66th Grandmaster of the Knights Hospitaller (b. 1663)
 December 12 (burial) – Antonina Houbraken, Dutch draughtswoman (b. 1686)
 December 22 – Sir William Robinson, 1st Baronet, British politician (b. 1655)
 December 26 – Antonio Caldara, Italian composer (b. 1670)
 date unknown
 Anna Colbjørnsdatter, Norwegian heroine (b. 1667)
 John Porteous, Scottish captain (b. c. 1695)
 Chen Shu, Chinese painter (b. 1660)

References 

 
Leap years in the Gregorian calendar